Thathamathu Nanupilla Gopakumaran Nair (born 27 June 1944), also known as Dr. Ambalapuzha Gopakumar (ഡോ.അമ്പലപ്പുഴ ഗോപകുമാർ) is a Malayalam poet, historian, orator and writer from Kerala, India. He is the recipient of  Kerala State Institute of Children's literature Award, 2012. Gopakumar is also the author of 'History of Ambalapuzha Sree Krishna Temple' which describes the origin and history of Amabalapuzha and the famous Sreekrishna Temple. He is widely regarded as an authority on the history of Chemapakassery, the erstwhile name of Ambalapuzha.

Dr. Gopakumar was the former director of Vaikom Kshetra Kalapeedom. In August 2016, he was given the 'Janmashtamy' award for literature. He is also the recipient of Amritakeerti Puraskar 2016,  in recognition of his contributions to spiritual, philosophical and cultural literature.

Biography
Ambalapuzha Gopakumar was born to Thathamathu C K Nanupilla and K.M.Rajamma, on 27 June 1944 at Ambalapuzha, Alappuzha in Kerala. He lost his father when he was nine. His childhood days were spent in Ambalapuzha where he attended the public 'Government Model High School, Ambalapuzha'.

Gopakumar was a professor at Sanatana Dharma College and retired as the Head of Malayalam Department in 1999. He is a member of the advisory board of Human Right Protection Mission and a director board member of Samastha Kerala Sahitya Parishath.

Writings

Gopakumar's first published work was Udayathinu Munmpu, which was published by National Book Stall. His poems have appeared in all leading literary magazines in Malayalam. His published works also include essays, biographies and history of ancient art forms of Chempakassery.

Poetic works
 Udayathinu Mumpu
 Idayante Patu
 Shyamakrishnan
 Manyamahajanam
 Amruthapuriyile Kattu
 Amruthadarshanam
 Harimadhavam
 Gangamayya
 Poliye Poli
 Sreekrishnaleela
 Akuthikuthu
 Rappadi

Prose list
 Ambalapuzha Kshethra Charithram
 Sukrutha Paithrukam
 Thirakal Maykatha Padamudrakal
 Ambalapuzha Sahodaranmar
 Sathyathinte Nanarthangal
 Velakali
 Charithra Padhathile Nakshatra Vilakku
 Ente Ullile Kadal
 Kairaliyude Varadanagal
 Ente Ullile Kadal (found and published Thakazhi's unknown work)
 Leelankanam (found and published Changampuzha's unknown work)

Awards

 2011 - Prof. Kozhisseril Balaraman Award for Literature
 2012 – Kerala State Institute of Children's literature Award
 2012 – Narayaneeyam Puraskaram for contributions in the spiritual domain
 2014 – Ekatha Award for Literature, Sharja
 2015 – Vasudeva Puraskaram from Ambalapuzha Temple
 2015 – Venmani Award for Literature
 2015 – Karuvatta Chandran Memorial Award for Literature
 2016 - Janmashtami Award
 2016 - Amritakeerthy Puraskar

Positions held

 Prof and the head of the Dept of Malayalam, S.D.College
 Ph D Board member, University of Kerala
 Director board member, Samastha Kerala Sahitya Parishath
 President, P.K Memorial Library, Ambalapuzha
 President, Ambalapuzha Temple Advisory Committee
 Secretary, Kunchan Nambiar Memorial, Ambalapuzha
 Chief editor, Sreevatsam
 Administrator, Jawahar Balabhavan, Alappuzha

References

External links
 Indian Express
 Asianet
 Akashavani Interview

1944 births
Living people
People from Alappuzha district
Writers from Kerala
Malayalam-language writers
Malayalam poets
Malayalam-language lyricists
20th-century Indian historians
Scientists from Kerala
20th-century Indian poets